Tridrepana unispina is a moth in the family Drepanidae. It is found in China (Fujian, Guangdong, Chongqing, Sichuan, Yunnan), Japan and Taiwan.

The wingspan is 27–42 mm. Adults are on wing in June.

The larvae feed on the leaves of Castanopsis formosana. Mature larvae curl a leaf margin and fix it with silk at the leaf tip to pupate inside.

References

Moths described in 1957
Drepaninae
Moths of Japan